Coralie Diane Winn  is an urban arts director based in Christchurch, New Zealand. Following the 2010 Canterbury earthquake she co-founded Gapfiller, a community organisation to create arts spaces and activities in the city.

Biography 
Winn is originally from Adelaide, Australia. She moved to Christchurch and became involved in the performing and creative arts. She performed with the Free Theatre Christchurch, managed the SOFA public art gallery and was employed by the Christchurch Arts Centre as public programmes co-ordinator. Made redundant after the 2010 earthquake, Winn co-founded Gapfiller to focus on creating arts spaces in the city.

Winn was awarded the Queen's Service Medal, for services to the arts, in the 2015 New Year Honours.

References

External links
Interview by the Christchurch Art Gallery

Recipients of the Queen's Service Medal
Living people
People from Adelaide
Australian emigrants to New Zealand
Year of birth missing (living people)